The Russian Cup in Figure Skating (Russian Cup - Rostelecom) is a series of annual All-Russian figure skating competitions among Russian figure skaters, organized by the Figure Skating Federation of Russia. The Russian Cup competitions include five stages and the final of the Russian Cup, in which athletes compete in men's and women's single skating, pair figure skating and in ice dancing.

The most frequent venues of the stages and the Cup Final: Moscow, Kazan, Samara, Perm, as well as Yoshkar-Ola, Sochi and Dmitrov.

Replacement by The Russian Grand Prix. Currently (Fall 2022) Russian skaters are not allowed to participate in any ISU Championship due an ISU ban. Russian stage of the international ISU Grand Prix (named after the same sponsor as the national cup - Rostelecom) was cancelled. The same year Russian officials renamed The Russian Cup as The Russian Grand Prix as a "replacement."

Participants 

Competitions are held for two categories:
 adults - according to the category of the Master of Sports (MS), provided that the athlete has reached 14 years old - no more than 18 athletes in the form
 Juniors - by category Candidates for the Master of Sports (CCM) - in single skating (no more than 30 athletes in the form), pair skating and ice dancing.
The strongest athletes of the territorial organizations of the FFKK of Russia are allowed to participate in the Cup Stages. In single skating, athletes can only apply for two stages of the Cup one by one of the ranks: the KMS or the MS. The list of participants is approved by the President of the Federation on the recommendation of the All-Russian Coaching Council.

Stages of the Russian Cup 
Stages of the Cup of Russia are held from September to December. Athletes who took places 1 to 8 at the first and second stages of the Cup are allowed to participate in stages III, IV and V.

According to the results of participation in two stages of the Cup of Russia, the admission of athletes (pairs) to participation in Russian Championship, Russian Championships and Cup Finals is determined.

Final Cup of Russia 
The final competition "Cup of Russia - Rostelecom" allowed athletes on the highest number of points scored in the form of two stages of the Cup of Russia, accrued for the places occupied by athletes. Also allowed are candidates for the national team of Russia among adults and juniors. The final list of participants is approved by the President of the Federation on the recommendation of the All-Russian Coaching Council. Up to 12 athletes (couples) are allowed in each type of program. Total not more than 144 people.

The final of the Russian Cup is traditionally held in February.

Senior medalists

Men

Ladies

Pairs

Ice dancing

External links 
 Figure Skating Federation of Russia 
Положение о всероссийских соревнованиях по фигурному катанию на коньках в сезоне 2015-2016 гг.
  Кубок России по фигурному катанию
 Лента статей о Кубке России по фигурному катанию на RSport.ru
  1997 г. Результаты Финала Кубка России

References

Figure skating in Russia